Nicole Janet Hain Echeverría (born 4 August 2000) is a futsal player and a footballer who plays as a forward for Campeonato de Fútbol Femenino club San Lorenzo de Almagro. Born in Paraguay, she moved to Argentina at young age, became a naturalized citizen of Argentina and is now a member of the Argentina women's national team.

International career
Hain is eligible to play for Paraguay, where she was born, or for Argentina, where she has grown up. She chose the latter. At first, she was called up to the under–20 level, but was later invited to train with the senior team. She made her international debut for Argentina on 7 November 2019, in a 2–1 away friendly won to coincidentally Paraguay.

International goals
Scores and results list Argentina's goal tally first

References

External links

2000 births
Living people
People from Fernando de la Mora, Paraguay
Paraguayan emigrants to Argentina
Naturalized citizens of Argentina
Argentine women's futsal players
Argentine women's footballers
Women's association football forwards
Club Atlético River Plate (women) players
Argentina women's youth international footballers
Argentina women's international footballers
Argentine sportspeople of Paraguayan descent